Brad Allen St. Louis (born August 19, 1976) is a former American football long snapper. He was drafted by the Cincinnati Bengals in the seventh round of the 2000 NFL Draft as a tight end. He played college football at Southwest Missouri State University.

Early years
St. Louis attended Belton High School in Belton, Missouri, graduating in 1995. St. Louis lettered in football, wrestling, tennis, and track. In football, as a tight end, he caught 42 passes for 508 yards over two years, and was named his team's Lineman of the Year as a junior. As a senior, Brad was a Missouri State Champion in wrestling.

College career
St. Louis attended Southwest Missouri State University where he earned a degree in dietetics. 
St. Louis was inducted into Missouri State's Athletic Hall of Fame February 5, 2011.
St. Louis graduated as the top tight end receiver in Bears' football history. He was a four-year letterman, and three-year starter, from 1996 to 1999. He closed his playing career with 93 catches for 1,074 yards and seven touchdowns, becoming the first Bears tight end to reach the 1,000-yard receiving mark. St. Louis played for the Bears under coach Del Miller for three seasons and coach Randy Ball for one year. In 1999, St. Louis earned Football Gazette Football Championship Subdivision All-America honors to go with three Missouri Valley Football Conference all-league first-team selections for his receiving and blocking skills. He was the first Bear to play in two postseason all-star games, competing in the East–West Shrine Game and the Hula Bowl following his senior season.

Professional career

Cincinnati Bengals
St. Louis was drafted by the Cincinnati Bengals in the seventh round (210th overall) of the 2000 NFL Draft. St. Louis was the first long snapper drafted in team history. Besides being the starting long snapper, St. Louis saw action on the kickoff return and punt return teams during his first three seasons with the team. In a game on November 12, 2000, against the Dallas Cowboys, St. Louis' snap was high. This caused Bengals holder and punter Daniel Pope to stand up and do an emergency punt from the Cowboys 24 yard line. The ball rolled into the end-zone, and the play went down as the closest punt to an opposition's end-zone in NFL history.  St. Louis also saw action as a tight end during his first three seasons. St. Louis spent 10 seasons with the Bengals before being cut in October 2009.

References

External links
 Official Player website
 NFL Stats

1976 births
Living people
Players of American football from Missouri
American football long snappers
Missouri State University alumni
American football tight ends
Cincinnati Bengals players
People from Belton, Missouri